The Deverel–Rimbury culture was a name given to an archaeological culture of the British Middle Bronze Age in southern England. It is named after two barrow sites in Dorset and dates to between c. 1600 BC and 1100 BC.

It is characterised by the incorrectly-named Celtic fields, palisaded cattle enclosures, small roundhouses and cremation burials either in urnfield cemeteries or under low, round barrows. Cremations from this period were also inserted into pre-existing barrows. The people were arable and livestock farmers.

Deverel–Rimbury pottery is characterised by distinctive globular vessels with tooled decoration and thick-walled, so-called "bucket urns" with cordoned, usually finger-printed decoration. In the southern counties of the UK, fabric is usually coarsely flint-tempered. In East Anglia and further northeast grog-tempering is typical.

The term Deverel-Rimbury is now mostly used to refer to the pottery types as archaeologists today believe that Deverel–Rimbury does not represent a single homogeneous cultural group but numerous disparate groups who shared a varying range of cultural traits.

References

External links
Deverel-Rimbury ware at the Museum of London

Archaeological cultures of Western Europe
Bronze Age Britain